The 2006 Nordic Figure Skating Championships were held from February 9 through 12, 2006 in Copenhagen, Denmark. The competition was open to elite figure skaters from Nordic countries. Skaters competed in four disciplines, men's singles, ladies' singles, pair skating, and ice dancing, across three levels: senior (Olympic-level), junior, and novice. Not every event was held at every level. This was the inaugural year of the novice-level competition.

Senior results

Men

Ladies

Pairs

Junior results

Men

Ladies

Ice dancing

Novice results

Boys

Girls

External links
 
 

Nordic Figure Skating Championships, 2006
Nordic Figure Skating Championships
International figure skating competitions hosted by Denmark
Nordic Figure Skating Championships, 2006